Santosh Bhattacharyya (1 November 1924 – 10 March 2011) was a Bengali Indian scholar, who served as a Vice Chancellor of the University of Calcutta, in Kolkata, India.

Early life
He was born in Calcutta on 1 November 1924 in a Brahmin family.

He studied economics at the renowned Scottish Church College and earned his master's degree from the University of Calcutta. Later he would earn a doctorate in economics from the London School of Economics 
.

Career
After earning his master's degree, he worked as a technical assistant at the Indian Statistical Institute.

He taught economics at the University of Calcutta in two phases: 1952–60, and later from 1968 to 1983. He chaired the department (1970–80), and became dean of the faculty of arts (1973–77).

He was Senior Economic Affairs Officer at the Development Planning Centre in the United Nations at New York (1966–68), member of the Tariff Commission, Government of India (1974–75), Chairman of several Pay Committees under West Bengal government during 1977–80.

He was a general secretary of Patha Bhavan, Calcutta in the 1980s.

Political beliefs
As a student, Bhattacharyya was a full member of the erstwhile Communist Party of India, and later continued as an active sympathizer of the parent party till he parted ways as a believer in market economy following the changes in China.

As a vice chancellor of the University of Calcutta (1983–1987), he was victimized for his apolitical stance and public criticism of the policies and practices of the Communist Party of India (Marxist) led Left Front regime (1977–2011) that interfered with the autonomy of the university.

Works
Red Hammer Over Calcutta University (1984–1987)
Management Control Systems : a Framework for Resolution of Problems of Implementation
Land Reforms in West Bengal. A Study on Implementation
Capital Longevity and Economic Growth

References

20th-century Indian economists
Scottish Church College alumni
University of Calcutta alumni
Alumni of the London School of Economics
Vice Chancellors of the University of Calcutta
Scientists from Kolkata
2011 deaths
1924 births
Place of death missing
Indian expatriates in the United Kingdom
Scholars from Kolkata